Durham bus station served the city of Durham, in County Durham, England. The bus station is managed by Durham County Council.

This bus station is situated on North Road in the city centre. It is currently closed and is in the process of being rebuilt.

Redevelopment 
In September 2020, plans to redevelop the bus station were approved. From 15 February 2021, all services were relocated to adjacent streets in order to allow the bus station to be demolished. The new bus station was expected to open in late summer 2022. In July 2022, it was announced that the project had been delayed to summer 2023.

Services
Services run from this bus station around the city of Durham and surrounding suburbs. One of the most famous buses in Durham is the Durham Cathedral Bus, a dedicated bus service that runs between Durham rail station and city coach parks to the cathedral.

Bus services from Durham bus station run as far afield as Newcastle, South Shields, Sunderland, Hartlepool, Middlesbrough, Darlington, Stanhope, Consett and the Gateshead MetroCentre shopping complex.

, the stand allocation was:

References

External links
 Traveline Bus Station Information - Durham bus station
 Durham bus station - Geograph

Bus stations in England
Transport in County Durham